This is the complete list of Asian Games medalists in wushu from 1990 to 2018.

Men

Taolu

Changquan
 Changquan / Short weapon (Daoshu or Jianshu) / Long weapon (Gunshu or Qiangshu): 1990–1998
 Changquan / Daoshu / Gunshu: 2002–2006
 Changquan: 2010–

Nanquan
 Nanquan: 1990–1998
 Nanquan / Nandao / Nangun: 2002–2006
 Nanquan / Nangun: 2010–

Taijiquan
 Taijiquan: 1990–1998
 Taijiquan / Taijijian: 2002–

Daoshu / Gunshu

Sanda

52 kg

56 kg

60 kg

65 kg

70 kg

75 kg

Women

Taolu

Changquan
 Changquan / Short weapon (Daoshu or Jianshu) / Long weapon (Gunshu or Qiangshu): 1990–1998
 Changquan / Jianshu / Qiangshu: 2002–2006
 Changquan: 2010–

Nanquan
 Nanquan: 1990–1998
 Nanquan / Nandao / Nangun: 2002–2006
 Nanquan / Nandao: 2010–

Taijiquan 
 Taijiquan: 1990–1998
 Taijiquan / Taijijian: 2002–

Jianshu / Qiangshu

Sanda

52 kg

60 kg

References

External links
 Olympic Council of Asia

Wushu
medalists